Brian D. Joseph (born November 22, 1951) is an American linguist specializing in historical linguistics. He is a Distinguished University Professor of Linguistics and the Kenneth E. Naylor Professor of South Slavic Linguistics at Ohio State University. His research interests include language change, Greek linguistics, Balkan linguistics, and morphological theory. He was elected a Member of the American Philosophical Society in 2019.

Joseph received an A.B. in linguistics from Yale University, and his A.M. and PhD in linguistics from Harvard University. He has spent his entire professional career at Ohio State University.

Joseph was the Vice-President of the Linguistic Society of America in 2018 and is currently serving as the organization's President. He was previously President of the North American Association for the History of the Language Sciences and currently serves as co-editor of the Journal of Greek Linguistics.

References

External links

Linguists from the United States
1951 births
Living people
Linguistic Society of America presidents
Yale University alumni
Harvard Graduate School of Arts and Sciences alumni
Ohio State University faculty
Members of the American Philosophical Society